Glacis United Football Club is a professional football club from Gibraltar, founded in 1965 and a member of the Gibraltar Football Association (GFA). The club share the Victoria Stadium with all other teams in the territory.

One of Gibraltar's most decorated teams, Glacis United currently compete in the Gibraltar National League with an under-23 team in the Gibraltar Intermediate League.

History
Glacis United were formed in 1965 and immediately saw success as the dominant force in Gibraltarian football throughout the 1960s through to the 1980s, winning 9 consecutive titles from 1965 to 1966 to 1973–74 and further consecutive titles in the 1980s. However, the emergence of Lincoln Red Imps saw Glacis's dominance decline, and their 17th and final title to date came in the 1999–2000 season. Since then, the club have settled into mid-table in Gibraltar, with the club particularly struggling since the GFA joined UEFA in 2013. The recruitment of Manuel Jimenez Perez in 2016, however, saw a more successful season with the club finishing 4th in the 2016–17 season, challenging St Joseph's for 3rd place and UEFA Europa League qualification. Manager Manuel Jimenez Perez left at the end of the season, and was replaced by Mariano Marcos Garcia on 9 July 2017. Juan Andrés Espinosa was announces as his assistant.

Honours
Gibraltar Premier Division: 17
 1966, 1967, 1968, 1969, 1970, 1971, 1972, 1973, 1974, 1976, 1981, 1982, 1983, 1985, 1989, 1997, 2000
Rock Cup: 5
 1975, 1981, 1982, 1997, 1998

Players

Current squad

Out on loan

Intermediate League squad

References

Football clubs in Gibraltar
Gibraltar National League clubs
Association football clubs established in 1965
1965 establishments in Gibraltar